Cécile Delpirou (born 23 March 1964) is a French politician from En Commun who served as Member of Parliament for Somme's 2nd constituency from 2020 to 2022.

Early life and career 
She was born in Saint-Maur-des-Fossés in Paris. An engineer by profession, Delpirou was active in the French Confederation of Management – General Confederation of Executives while working at the Whirlpool Corporation plant at Amiens.

Political career 
In the 2017 French legislative election, she was the substitute candidate of Barbara Pompili. She joined Parliament in August 2020.

See also 

 List of deputies of the 15th National Assembly of France

References 

1964 births
Living people
People from Somme (department)
Politicians from Hauts-de-France
People from Amiens
La République En Marche! politicians
21st-century French women politicians
21st-century French politicians
Women members of the National Assembly (France)
Deputies of the 15th National Assembly of the French Fifth Republic

French women engineers
21st-century women engineers
French women trade unionists